Krešimir Mikić (born 17 April 1974) is a Croatian theatre and film actor. He is known for his roles in acclaimed feature films, including Zlatko in Sex, Drink and Bloodshed, Krešo in I Love You, Mirko in The Melon Route, and Don Fabijan in The Priest's Children.

On stage, he is known for his prominent activity in the Zagreb Youth Theatre and the Croatian National Theatre in Zagreb.

Selected filmography
Fine Dead Girls (Fine mrtve djevojke) (2002)
Witnesses (Svjedoci) (2003)
The One Who Will Stay Unnoticed (Onaj koji će ostati neprimijećen) (2003)
The Society of Jesus (Družba Isusova) (2004)
Sex, Drink and Bloodshed (Seks, piće i krvoproliće) (2004)
100 Minutes of Glory (Sto minuta Slave) (2004)
I Love You (Volim te) (2005)
The Melon Route (Put lubenica) (2006)
The Blacks (Crnci) (2009)
72 Days (Sedamdeset i dva dana) (2010)
Vegetarian Cannibal (Ljudožder vegetarijanac) (2012)
The Priest's Children (Svećenikova djeca) (2013)
The Diary of Diana B. (Dnevnik Diane Budisavljević) (2019)

References

External links

1974 births
Living people
Croatian male stage actors
Croatian male film actors
Golden Arena winners
People from Osijek
Croatian Theatre Award winners